James Whitely may refer to:

 James Whitley (alpine skier) (born 1997), British Paralympic skier
 James Whitley (American football) (born 1979), American football player
 James Whitley (archaeologist), British archaeologist
 James L. Whitley (1872–1959), American politician

See also
 Jim Whitley (born 1975), Northern Irish former footballer